"Om du var här" (Swedish for If You Were Here) is a song by Swedish alternative rock band Kent. It was released in October 1997 as the first single from the album Isola. A version in English was also released under the title "If You Were Here".

It contains three b-sides that is not on the album; "På nära håll", "Utan dina andetag" and a remix of "Om du var här" called Unload/Reload remix made by the Swedish jazz/electro pop group Koop.

The cover of this single can vary. The Maxi single has an aircraft taking off in the background as opposed to the two track single where the aircraft has been edited out.

Track listing

CD Single (Maxi)
 Om du var här
 På nära håll
 Utan dina andetag
 Om du var här - Unload/Reload remix

CD in cardboard sleeve
 Om du var här
 På nära håll

Charts

Swedish version

English version

References

1997 singles
Kent (band) songs
1997 songs